Henry Gehring   (January 24, 1881 – April 18, 1912) was a pitcher in Major League Baseball. He played for the Washington Senators in 1907 and 1908.

External links

1881 births
1912 deaths
Major League Baseball pitchers
Washington Senators (1901–1960) players
St. Paul Saints (Western League) players
Winnipeg (minor league baseball) players
Duluth Cardinals players
Duluth White Sox players
Wichita Jobbers players
Minneapolis Millers (baseball) players
Des Moines Champs players
St. Paul Saints (AA) players
Baseball players from Minnesota